Robert Dhéry (27 April 1921 – 3 December 2004) (born Robert Léon Henri Fourrey or Robert Foullcy) was a French comedian, actor, director and screenwriter.

He was married to actor Colette Brosset, with whom he appeared onstage in La Plume de Ma Tante.

He appeared on Broadway from 1958 to 1960 in La Plume de Ma Tante, and was, along with the rest of the entire cast (Pamela Austin, Colette Brosset, Roger Caccia, Yvonne Constant, Genevieve Coulombel, Michael Kent, Jean Lefevre, Jacques Legras, Michael Modo, Pierre Olaf, Nicole Parent, Ross Parker, Henri Pennec) awarded a Special Tony Award 1959 for contribution to the theatre.

Selected filmography
 Night Shift (1944)
 Branquignol (1949)
 I Like Only You (1949)
 Bernard and the Lion (1951)
 Love Is Not a Sin (1952)
 La demoiselle et son revenant (1952)
 The Pirates of the Bois de Boulogne (1954)

References

External links

1921 births
2004 deaths
People from Seine-Saint-Denis
French film directors
French male screenwriters
20th-century French screenwriters
French male film actors
French male stage actors
20th-century French male writers